Monte Castelo is a municipality in the state of São Paulo in Brazil. The population is 4,166 (2020 est.) in an area of 234 km². The elevation is 375 m.

The municipality contains 18.7% of the  Aguapeí State Park, created in 1998.

References

Municipalities in São Paulo (state)